Lundu is a town and the capital of Lundu District located in the northwest of Kuching Division of Sarawak, Malaysia, and borders the Indonesian Province of West Kalimantan.

History
Lundu is a district located in the Northwest of Kuching Division of Sarawak, Malaysia, and borders with Indonesian Province of West Kalimantan. Once upon a time, Lundu was a strategic area in the waters of Tanjung Datu that has been known for centuries in history, including in the history of Majapahit, China and Srivijaya. This was realized by the British colonialists when Lundu was later made the first stronghold.

As far as anyone knows, the lands around Lundu was empty of people until relatively recently. Although the main river is called Batang Kayan, "the Kayan river," there is no evidence at all that any Kayan people ever lived there. In the middle of the eighteenth century a group of Bidayuh people from near Bau migrated and settled on the west bank of the Batang Kayan, where Kampong Stunggang Melayu now stands. They came to be called the Dayak Lundu, and though the last member of the tribe died in the 1960s, you can still see the grove of durian trees they planted.

The name "Lundu" itself is taken from a small catfish that abounds in the Sungai Lundu which flows down from Gunung Gading. There are also local sources said that Lundu name comes from community groups known as the Undu, but when mixing marriage with Malay, Bidayuh and Iban this community has group into Malay, Bidayuh and Iban. Undu is actually a variation of the name Undi or Datu Undi or known as Raja Jarom who comes from Minangkabau, Sumatra. Datu Undi or Undu has seven children. His children became the government in Saribas, Samarahan, Kalaka, Sadong. His children are very famous such as Dato Terawoh in Kota Samarahan and Datu Godam (Saribas) who use the title of Abang.

Towards the close of the eighteenth century three groups of people at the same time came separately to make their homes in Lundu. From the east came the Ibans. These Ibans were originally from Balau on the west bank of the Batang Lupar. As the Iban were coming to Lundu from the east, Chinese and Selako settlers were arriving from the west, over the hills that separate Sarawak from what is now Indonesian Borneo. Chinese had been living in Pontianak and Sambas for a hundred years or more. When gold was discovered in Bau, Chinese migrated there. Also from the west came the Selako or Selakau. Malays also came to settle from the Natuna Islands.

What is wonderful about Lundu, is that although four different people settled very close together, there has from the beginning never been any friction between them. They seek a better life, and each people pursued their aim in a way that did not compete with the others. Lundu had electricity and piped water (from Gunung Gading) by the early 60s. The Lundu hospital was built in 1965, and now offers treatment for all except the most serious problems. They have a dental clinic and ultrasound screening for mothers-to-be. Until 1968, Lundu could be reached from Kuching only by boat. The road from Bau to Lundu was completed in that year and regular bus service began.

Lundu is currently under constant development, with more and more public infrastructures and other being built and proposed.

Politics
In state and federal Constituencies, Lundu area is represented by Barisan Nasional:

Y.B. Azizul Annuar Adenan of PBB - Member of Sarawak State Legislative Council for N3 Tanjung Datu.
Y.B. Billy anak Sujang of SUPP - Member of Sarawak Legislative Council for N1 Opar.
Y.B. Datuk Dr. Wan Junaidi Tuanku Hj. Jaafar of PBB - Member of Parliament of Malaysia for P193 Santubong.
Y.B. Mordi anak Bimol of DAP - Member of Parliament of Malaysia for P192 Mas Gading.

Local government
Lundu District Office is the nerve center of the administration of the District. The first district officer was appointed in 1877 and the current district officer is the 44th. The district officer has wide statutory powers, to enable him to function effectively. The district officer is also chairman of the Lundu District Council.

Lundu District Council provides municipal services for Lundu District. The secretary to the Lundu District Council is the CEO. The early history of the Lundu District Council is just like other councils in Sarawak which was in 1953, chaired by D.L Bruen (1953-1956), which was then known as Lundu District Authority. On the 1 April 1957, the Lundu District Local Authority was re-established and known as Lundu District Council until the restructuring of Local Councils in 1981 till today to handle the management and administrative duties of the Lundu District.

The Lundu District Council Office is located at the Batang Kayan Road, near the town of Lundu, opposite the Batang Kayan river. There are 32 council members including Chairman and Deputy Chairman appointed as Council Member by His Excellency's Speaker of the State of Sarawak to perform all the obligations entrusted to the people.

Transportation

Local Bus 

Lundu is located 100 km from Kuching City, 70 km from Bau Town, 28 km from Sematan Bazzar, 26 km from Biawak Bazzar, 18 km from Kampong Sebako and 10 km from Pandan Beach. It is accessible by road. In the mid- to late-2000s, Batang Kayan Bridge was officially opened to traffic, ending the ferry services to and from Lundu through Batang Kayan. Lundu was previously connected by air, and there are remains of the former airstrip in Lundu. Part of the runway of the old airstrip is now used as a road.

Biawak which is near the Indonesia-Malaysia border is the location of one of three land border crossings into Indonesia. The Malaysian checkpoint is called the Biawak Immigration, Customs, Quarantine and Security Checkpoint while the Indonesian checkpoint is called the Aruk Border Crossing Checkpoint. The nearest towns to Aruk are Sambas town about 93m away, and Singkawang about 160 km away. Both towns are in West Kalimantan.

Education

Primary schools
SK Raso
SK Bokah
SK Stungkor
SK Selampit
SK Sampadi
SK Siar Campuran
SK Lebai Mentali
SK Biawak
SK Hollyname
SK Bumiputra
SK Sebiris
SK Serayan/Keranji
SK Paon
SK Sebako
SK Sebat
SK Pueh
SK Sematan
SK Telok Melano/Serabang
SJK (C) Chung Hua Serayan/Selarat
SJK (C) Chung Hua Sematan
SJK (C) Chung Hua Lundu

Secondary schools
SMK Lundu
SMK Sematan
SMK Senibong

Climate
Lundu has a tropical rainforest climate (Af) with heavy to very heavy rainfall year-round and with extremely heavy rainfall in January and February.

Economic activities
 Agriculture - cocoa, black pepper, paddy, fruits and palm oil)
 Aquaculture - fish (sea bass hatchery), prawns (tiger prawns) and crab (flower and mud crabs)
 Fishing
 Tourism - homestay programs
 Cottage industry - fish crackers, traditional cakes and biscuits and chips, supported by government agencies such as Department of Agriculture, FELCRA and SALCRA

Tourist attractions
 Tanjung Datu National Park - westernmost tip of Sarawak
 Gunung Gading National Park - home to the Rafflesia
 Siar Beach
 Pandan Beach
 Pugu Beach
 Sematan Beach - Abang Amin Beach, Sungai Kilong Beach and Pueh Beach
 Telok Melano Beach
 Talang-Talang Islands (Greater and Lesser Talang-Talang) - turtle sanctuary
 Samunsam Wildlife Sanctuary
 Sampadi Island
 Rambungan Beach
 Sebako hot spring
 Jangkar Waterfalls
 Pueh Longhouse Homestay - Salako ethnic
 Telok Melano Homestay - Malay ethnic
 Kangka Longhouse Homestay - Iban ethnic

References

External links

Lundu District Council official website
Gunung Gading National Park
Otto's Lundu Page, created by Dr.Otto Steinmeyer

Lundu District
Towns in Sarawak